Royal Air Force Holmpton or more simply RAF Holmpton is a former Royal Air Force Cold War era nuclear bunker that was built in the 1950s as an early warning radar station as part of the ROTOR Radar Defence Programme. Located just south of the village of Holmpton, in the East Riding of Yorkshire, England, RAF Holmpton remained a part of the Defence Estate right up to 8 December 2014 when it was sold into private ownership after 62 years of military service.

Rotor
The Bunker Design type R3-M2 (R3=Rotor Bunker Design R3 – M2=Including 2 additional mezzanine floors) was first built from 1951–3 and started life as an early warning radar station, part of the ROTOR programme. The bunker had originally been intended to be built at RAF Patrington, which was quite close, but the ground conditions at Patrington prevented this. An R3-M2 is a larger version of the standard UK R3 Bunker and RAF Holmpton was the only example of this type of structure in the UK as 1: It combined several Radar functions in the one building and 2: was a prototype for three similar bunkers built in Europe during the Cold War. The shell is then encased in brickwork and lined with pitch to form a waterproof membrane. Between the top of the bunker and the surface there is a concrete buster slab inserted to provide a deflection of any incoming ordnance. The bunker was created by one continuous pour of concrete and gravel which cost £1.5 million in 1953.

In the late 1960s it became a Master Comprehensive Radar Station trialling the Ericsson 'Fire Brigade Auto Intercept Radar System', and later going on to house a massive Elliott & Plessey computer system for the 'Linesman Radar Project'. All Radar functions at the site eventually closed in 1974 and for the next few years the site was used for training.

Command and Control Information System
In the 1980s, the bunker was converted to form the new Emergency War Headquarters for RAF Support Command. However with the end of the Cold War in 1991 this function ceased and the site returned to training until 1994 when it was given a major refurbishment to become the first experimental (trialling) headquarters for the new UK Air CCIS system Electronic Warfare Advanced Communications System. This function remained at RAF Holmpton until 2002 although the CCIS Operations Room, known as AREA 7 remained intact until the end of July 2012.

Royal Observer Corps
Throughout its years as a Radar Station and through the years of Support Command & CCIS, the site also contained an operations area for the Royal Observer Corps (ROC) and although the Corps was 'stood down' in 1992 with some ROC units remaining as NBC cells until the end of 1995, one last Monitoring Unit remained at RAF Holmpton until December 1997, during the planning and implementation of a new electronic monitoring system. This made RAF Holmpton the last place in the UK where any members of the Royal Observer Corps ever served, and is a unique part of the site's history. In 1997 this project was abandoned and the site was then maintained under contract until 2003 by AQUMEN Defence. During this time it was used for occasional training by the RAF Regiment & the TA. In 2003 the site was leased for 25 years by the Ministry of Defence to RL(FRAFS)BLC Limited and the day-to-day management passed to HIPPO (The Holmpton Initiative Project Planning Office). By late 2003 plans were underway for a public exhibition on the site which opened to visitors in 2004.

Private ownership
In 2012 as a result of Government cutbacks and following a review of the Defence Estate the Ministry of Defence decided that the site was no longer required by the Air Force and the decision was made to terminate the lease and sell the whole site to RL(FRAFS)BLC who already held the original 25-year lease – During this period of transition the public visits continued to operate and the sale was completed on 8 December 2014. The last of the guided tours was held on 21 December 2014 and plans are now underway to close and completely refurbish the site during 2015 and Re Open it to public visits with a totally new visitor experience for Easter 2016 – The refurbishment has now been completed and the site reopened to visitors on 23 March 2016.

References

External links

RAF Holmpton – official website
Detailed historical record about RAF Holmpton
Imperial war Museum blog on the staff who worked at Holmpton bunker
 Hannah King (2018), The 'Moles' Who Served In A Secret Cold War Bunker, Forces.net ; video (via YouTube) 

Royal Air Force stations in Yorkshire
Museums in the East Riding of Yorkshire
Military and war museums in England
Cold War museums in the United Kingdom